Bacadéhuachi Municipality is a municipality in Sonora in north-western Mexico.

Its seat is Bacadéhuachi.

Area and population
The area of the municipality is 1,530.47 km2 and the population was 1,264 in 2005, most of whom were residing in the only settlement, which serves as the municipal seat.  .  The municipal seat is located at an elevation of 850 meters.

References

Municipalities of Sonora